Lechenaultia juncea, commonly known as scarlet leschenaultia, is a species of flowering plant in the family Goodeniaceae and is endemic to the south-west of Western Australia. It is an open, ascending shrub with narrow, crowded, rather fleshy leaves, and scarlet to orange-red flowers.

Description

Taxonomy
Lechenaultia laricina was first formally described in 1839 by John Lindley in A Sketch of the Vegetation of the Swan River Colony. The specific epithet (laricina) means "larch-tree like".

Distribution and habitat
Scarlet leschenaultia usually grows in sandy soils in woodland between Meckering, Clackline and Kukerin in the Avon Wheatbelt, Jarrah Forest and Mallee biogeographic regions of south-western Western Australia.

Conservation status
This leschenaultia is listed as "Threatened Flora (Declared Rare Flora — Extant)" by the Department of Biodiversity, Conservation and Attractions.

References

laricina
Plants described in 1839
Flora of Western Australia
Taxa named by John Lindley